Calidifontibacter is a genus of bacteria from the family of Dermacoccaceae.

References

Micrococcales
Bacteria genera